Alton Desbrisay Taylor (March 30, 1889 – July 25, 1947) was a Canadian politician. He served in the Legislative Assembly of New Brunswick as member of the Conservative party representing Sunbury County from 1925 to 1935.

References

1889 births
1947 deaths
People from St. Stephen, New Brunswick
Progressive Conservative Party of New Brunswick MLAs
20th-century Canadian politicians